IROC XV was the fifteenth year of IROC competition, which took place in 1991. It was the second year the Dodge Daytona was used in competition, and continued the format introduced in IROC VIII. Race one took place on the Daytona International Speedway, race two took place at Talladega Superspeedway, race three ran at Michigan International Speedway, and the year finished at Watkins Glen International. Rusty Wallace won the series championship and $175,000.

The roster of drivers and final points standings were as follows:

Race results

Race One, Daytona International Speedway
Friday, February 15th, 1991

one *: Bonus points for leading the most laps.two **: Bonus points for leading the 2nd most laps.three ***: Bonus points for leading the 3rd most laps.

Average speed: 184.521 mphCautions: 2Margin of victory: 1 clLead changes: 14

Race Two, Talladega Superspeedway
Saturday, May 4, 1991

one *: Bonus points for leading the most laps.two **: Bonus points for leading the 2nd most laps.three ***: Bonus points for leading the 3rd most laps (since there was a tie for 2nd both drivers received 2nd most laps led bonus points).

Average speed: 187.958 mphCautions: 2Margin of victory: 1 clLead changes: 9

Cautions

Lap Leader Breakdown

Race Three, Michigan International Speedway
Saturday, August 3, 1991

one *: Bonus points for leading the most laps.two **: Bonus points for leading the 2nd most laps.three ***: Bonus points for leading the 3rd most laps (since there was a tie for 2nd both drivers received 2nd most laps led bonus points).

Average speed: 158.744 mphCautions: noneMargin of victory: .2 secLead changes: 6

Race Four, Watkins Glen International
Saturday, August 10, 1991 

one *: Bonus points for leading the most laps.two **: Bonus points for leading the 2nd most laps (did not occur in this race so not awarded).three ***: Bonus points for leading the 3rd most laps (did not occur in this race so not awarded).

Average speed: 111.49 mphCautions: 1 (Lap 1 for Al Unser Jr Crash)Margin of victory: .15 secLead changes: 0

Notes
 Tom Kendall did not start the last two races due to injury, and was awarded last place points.
 Al Unser Jr. started in a backup car from 11th position after a first lap accident.
 This was also the last time a road course was used in IROC competition until the final edition in 2006.

References

External links
IROC XV History - IROC Website

International Race of Champions
1991 in American motorsport